Above, Over And Beyond is Hale's third album released on April 28, 2008 by EMI Philippines. The album contains singles Pitong Araw, Leap Of Faith, Over And Over (And Over Again) and Sandali Na Lang. It was the last album to feature drummer
Omnie Saroca.

History 

Having to deal with the pressure they encountered due to their instant success after the release of their two preceding albums, Hale decided to make a 10-month hiatus from the music industry as they reasoned out it was affecting their status as musical artists and their performances. During their time of hiatus, they established the Treehouse Productions where they would help the needy children suffering from illnesses through music.

It was not long until Hale was motivated to put in work for their third effort. After the release of the first single of this album, Pitong Araw, the album was later released on April 28, 2008.

Track listing

References 

2008 albums
Hale (band) albums